Gold is a compilation album by Canadian rock band Rush, released on April 25, 2006.

The Gold compilation is a repackaging of the two 1997 Rush compilation albums Retrospective I and Retrospective II, with the exception of the third track of Retrospective I "Something for Nothing," which has been removed and replaced by "Working Man" (last track, #14) on the first disc.

Track listing
All lyrics by Neil Peart unless noted, all music by Geddy Lee and Alex Lifeson unless noted

Disc 1 
 "The Spirit of Radio"
 "The Trees"
 "Freewill"
 "Xanadu"
 "Bastille Day"
 "By-Tor and the Snow Dog"
 "Anthem"
 "Closer to the Heart" (Lyrics: Peart/Peter Talbot)
 "2112: Overture"
 "2112: The Temples of Syrinx"
 "La Villa Strangiato"(Music: Lee/Lifeson/Peart)
 "Fly by Night"
 "Finding My Way" (Lyrics: Lee)
 "Working Man" (Lyrics: Lee)

Disc 2 
 "The Big Money"
 "Red Barchetta"
 "Subdivisions"
 "Time Stand Still"
 "Mystic Rhythms"
 "The Analog Kid"
 "Distant Early Warning"
 "Marathon"
 "The Body Electric"
 "Mission"
 "Limelight"
 "Red Sector A"
 "New World Man"
 "Tom Sawyer" (Lyrics: Peart/Pye Dubois)
 "Force Ten" (Lyrics: Peart/Pye Dubois)

Track origins

Disc 1
Tracks 13 & 14 from Rush (1974)Tracks 6, 7 & 12 from Fly by Night (1975)Track 5 from Caress of Steel (1975)Tracks 9 & 10 from 2112 (1976)Tracks 4 & 8 from A Farewell to Kings (1977)Tracks 2 & 11 from Hemispheres (1978)Tracks 1 & 3 from Permanent Waves (1980)

Disc 2
Tracks 2, 11 & 14 from Moving Pictures (1981)Tracks 3, 6 & 13 from Signals (1982)Tracks 7, 9 & 12 from Grace Under Pressure (1984)Tracks 1, 5 & 8 from Power Windows (1985)Tracks 4, 10 & 15 from Hold Your Fire (1987)

Personnel 
Geddy Lee    – bass, vocals, synthesizers
Alex Lifeson – acoustic and electric guitars
Neil Peart   – drums, percussion, lyricist
John Rutsey  – drums on "Finding My Way" and "Working Man"
with:
Aimee Mann – vocals on "Time Stand Still"

See also 
 Retrospective I
 Retrospective II
 Retrospective III: 1989–2008

References 

Rush
2006 compilation albums
Rush (band) compilation albums
Mercury Records compilation albums